Bruce Lee Rothschild (born August 26, 1941) is an American mathematician and educator, specializing in combinatorial mathematics. He is a professor emeritus of mathematics at the University of California, Los Angeles.

Early life and education
Rothschild was born in 1941 in Los Angeles, California.

He earned a Ph.D. from Yale University in 1967 under the supervision of Øystein Ore.

Career
Rothschild, together with Ronald Graham, formulated one of the most monumental results in Ramsey theory, the Graham–Rothschild theorem. He has collaborated with American mathematicians Joel Spencer and Ronald Graham on key texts related to Ramsey theory. Rothschild wrote several papers with Paul Erdős, giving him an Erdős number of 1.

Awards and honors
In 1971, Rothschild shared the Pólya Prize (SIAM) with four other mathematicians for his work on Ramsey theory. In 2012, he became a fellow of the American Mathematical Society.

References

Combinatorialists
20th-century American mathematicians
21st-century American mathematicians
University of California, Los Angeles faculty
Yale University alumni
Living people
1941 births
Fellows of the American Mathematical Society